Chi is a 2019 Burmese drama film, directed by Nyunt Myanmar Nyi Nyi Aung starring Nay Toe, Thet Mon Myint and Shwe Thamee. The film, produced by Aung Tine Kyaw Film Production premiered in Myanmar on December 26, 2019.

Cast
Nay Toe as Khoon Da
Thet Mon Myint as Mu Yar
Shwe Thamee as Ngu

References

2019 films
2010s Burmese-language films
Burmese drama films
Films shot in Myanmar